Hezar Jerib (also Romanized as Hezār Jerīb, Hazār Jarīb, Hazār Jerīb, and Hezār Jarīb) is a village in Valanjerd Rural District, in the Central District of Borujerd County, Lorestan Province, Iran. At the 2006 census, its population was 261, in 69 families.

References 

Towns and villages in Borujerd County